Tropicus is a genus of variegated mud-loving beetles in the family Heteroceridae. There are more than 30 described species in Tropicus.

Species
These 34 species belong to the genus Tropicus:

 Tropicus alcicornis Mascagni, 1989
 Tropicus aratus Miller, 1992
 Tropicus arawak Bameul, 1995
 Tropicus bartolozzi Mascagni, 1994
 Tropicus bilineatus (Chevrolat, 1864)
 Tropicus braza Miller, 1992
 Tropicus carus Pacheco, 1964
 Tropicus cithara Pacheco
 Tropicus davidsoni Mascagni, 1993
 Tropicus debilis (Sharp, 1882)
 Tropicus excellens Miller, 1992
 Tropicus hevelorum Skalický, 2007
 Tropicus imperator Pacheco, 1964
 Tropicus infidus Miller, 1992
 Tropicus insidiosus (Grouvelle, 1896)
 Tropicus ladomae Ivie & Stribling
 Tropicus ladonnae Ivie & Stribling, 1984
 Tropicus lituratus (Kiesenwetter, 1843)
 Tropicus milleri Mascagni, 1993
 Tropicus minutus (Fall, 1920)
 Tropicus nigellus
 Tropicus niger Skalický, 2007
 Tropicus plaumanni Pacheco, 1964
 Tropicus pusillus (Say, 1823)
 Tropicus riosensis Skalický, 2007
 Tropicus sagittarius Pacheco, 1964
 Tropicus sparus Miller, 1992
 Tropicus speciosa Miller, 1992
 Tropicus squamosus Pacheco, 1964
 Tropicus trifidus Skalický, 2007
 Tropicus trinidadensis Pacheco, 1964
 Tropicus tuberculatus Pacheco, 1964
 Tropicus tucumanensis Pacheco, 1964
 Tropicus vicinus Miller, 1992

References

Further reading

 
 

Byrrhoidea
Articles created by Qbugbot